Windows 10 Fall Creators Update (also known as version 1709 and codenamed "Redstone 3") is the fourth major update to Windows 10 and the third in a series of updates under the Redstone codenames. It carries the build number 10.0.16299.

PC version history
The first preview was released to Insiders on April 7, 2017. The final release was made available to Windows Insiders on September 26, 2017, before being released to the public on October 17.

The update would have originally reached end of service on April 14, 2020 for Education and Enterprise editions, but this was postponed to October 13 of the same year due to the COVID-19 pandemic, after the release of build 16299.2166.

Mobile version history

See also
Windows 10 version history
Windows 10 Mobile version history

References

Windows 10
History of Microsoft
Software version histories